Kinetic Group (formerly known as AATS Group) is an Australian-based multinational bus company that wholly owns a number of bus operations in Australia and New Zealand, including the SkyBus business, which operates bus services to a number of airports in both countries. Through its 51%-owned subsidiary Go-Ahead Group based in the United Kingdom, Kinetic also operates buses and railway services in the United Kingdom, Singapore, Germany, Ireland and Norway.

Kinetic is majority owned by Canadian pension fund OPTrust and Australian infrastructure manager Infrastructure Capital Group.

History
AATS started in 2014 as a consortium that included Catalyst Direct Capital Management and OPTrust Private Markets Group to purchase SkyBus. Michael Sewards and Adam Begg were the founders and became the co-CEOs of the company.

AATS purchased Transit Australia Group (TAG) in April 2019, including bus companies Sunbus and Surfside Buslines. It was rebranded the Kinetic Group in August 2019, and remains the parent company of SkyBus and TAG. In the same month, OPTrust began to seek a co-investor in Kinetic Group, who would hold a minority share in the group.

Kinetic acquired Sydney bus and coach charter company Telfords Bus & Coach in November 2019, followed by Cairns bus operator Love's Bus Service Queensland in January 2020.

In March 2020, it was announced that Kinetic would buy GoBus with 1,700 buses, subject to approval by the New Zealand Overseas Investment Office. Approval was given in June and the acquisition was completed in August 2020. 

In December 2020, Campbell's Coaches, Townsville was acquired. In February 2021, Kinetic announced it had agreed terms to purchase Greyhound Australia's resources business Greyhound Resources that provides mine transport for workers in the Bowen Basin, Hunter Valley, South Australia and Northern Territory with 170 vehicles. The deal was expected to close in April 2021. This has since been rebranded as Kinetic Resources.

In April 2021, it was announced that Redline Coaches of Tasmania would be acquired.

Following OPTrust's 2019 announcement of seeking a co-investor, Infrastructure Capital Group acquired a 49% shareholding in Kinetic in October 2021.

On 31 January 2022, Kinetic Melbourne took over the routes operated by Transdev Melbourne, with 531 buses, under a contract which runs until June 2031. In February 2022, Kinetic acquired Sainty's North East Bus Service, with vehicles and drivers joining Kinetic's Redline Coaches business.

In March 2022, Kinetic announced its acquisition of NZ Bus, which operates in Auckland, Tauranga and Wellington and is one of New Zealand's biggest urban bus operators, with 800 buses and 14 depots. In the same month, Kinetic also announced the acquisition of Mersey Bus & Coach Services (Merseylink), the largest private operator in Tasmania which operates 51 general and school bus services in Devonport and north-west Tasmania. In June 2022, in partnership with Globalvia, Kinetic's offer to purchase the Go-Ahead Group was recommended for acceptance by its board The sale was approved by Go-Ahead's shareholders in August 2022. Kinetic has a 51% shareholding.

In November 2022, Kinetic began operating a new depot at High Wycombe in Perth, Western Australia, offering school route and charter services, general charter and event services.

In late 2022, four of Kinetic's subsidiaries, Sunbus (including Love's Bus Service Queensland), Surfside Buslines, Telfords Bus & Coach and Redline Coaches, were rebranded to Kinetic.

Operations
Below is Kinetic's current and former bus companies that it operates:

Australia 
Kinetic has an extensive presence in Australia operating in lmsot every state and terriorty from commuter services to charter and coach services.

Northern Territory 
Greyhound Resources. Following the acquisition and re-brand of Greyhound Resources, Kinetic provides superior tailored bus services for the mining and resources sector.

Queensland 
With the rebranding of several former subsidiaries, Kinetic operates an extensive commuter transport service throughout the state in the following regions:

 Cairns

 Mackay
 Magentic Island 
 Rockhampton
 Bundaberg
 Sunshine Coast
 Gold Coast

New South Wales 

 Tweed Coast (Commuter service)
 Sydney (coach and charter service only)

Victoria 

 Melbourne (commuter service)
 Skybus (airport transfers)

Tasmania 

 Merseylink (Operates a commuter bus service in Devonport)
 School and charter service throughout the state

Western Australia 

 Kinetic Resources (Kinetic provides superior tailored bus services for the mining and resources sector)
 Coach and school service

New Zealand 

 NZBus (Operates commuter servoces in Auckland, Tauranga and Wellington)
 Go Bus (Operates commuter and transport services in Hamilton, Hawke's Bay, Tauranga, Christchurch, Gisborne, Dunedin and Invercargill.)
 Johnston's (tour and charter service)

Go-Ahead

Through its 51% shareholding in Go-Ahead Group, Kinetic also operates buses in the United Kingdom, Singapore and Ireland, and railway services in the United Kingdom, Norway and Germany.

Former operations 
Queensland

(Love's Bus Service Queensland, Sun Bus and Surfside Buslines were dissolved and re-branded as Kinetic in late 2022)
Campbell's Coaches
Love's Bus Service Queensland
Sunbus 
Sunbus Cairns
Sunbus Magnetic Island
Sunbus Rockhampton
Sunbus Sunshine Coast
Sunbus Townsville
Surfside Buslines 
Duffy's City Buses - Bundaberg

New South Wales

(Telfords Bus & Coach as well as Surfside Buslines were dissolved and re-branded as Kinetic in late 2022)
Surfside Buslines 
Telfords Bus & Coach 

Tasmania

(Redline Coaches was being dissolved and re-branded as Kinetic from late 2022)
Redline Coaches

References

External links
Official website

2014 establishments in Australia
Australian companies established in 2014
Transport companies established in 2014
Companies based in Melbourne
Holding companies of Australia
Kinetic Group companies